Spanish Pointer may refer to three Spanish bird dogs:
Burgos Pointer, a modern Spanish dog breed from Castile, Spain known in English as the Spanish Pointer
Pachón navarro, a "double-nose" Spanish dog breed from Navarre
Old Spanish Pointer, an extinct dog breed and predecessor of the English Pointer dog